"Funny Farm" is the 13th episode of fifth season of the British BBC anthology TV series Play for Today. The episode was a television play that was originally broadcast on 27 February 1975. "Funny Farm" was written by Roy Minton, directed by Alan Clarke, produced by Mark Shivas, and starred Tim Preece.

Alan Wellbeck (Tim Preece) is a nurse in a mental hospital. His day-to-day struggles with personal feelings and troubled patients provide humour and pathos against the backdrop of a public institution.

Cast
 Tim Preece as Alan Welbeck
 Allan Surtees as Arthur Rothwell
 Bernard Severn as Ted Spinner
 Michael Bilton as Sidney Charlton
 Kenneth Scott as Jonathan
 John Locke as Jeff West
 Gordon Christie as Jack
 Anthony Langdon as Les Dewhurst
 Wally Thomas as Mr. Chadd
 Donald Bisset as Mr. Scully
 Terence Davies as Walter
 Arnold Diamond as James Ball
 Francis Mortimer as Graham
 Helena McCarthy as Joyce
 Michael Percival as John
 Dorothy Frere as Edna Ball
 Chris Sanders as Bill Spence
 Patricia Moore as Miss Taylor
 John Cross

References

External links
 

1975 British television episodes
1975 television plays
British television plays
Play for Today